Helluomorpha is a genus of beetles in the family Carabidae.

Containing the following species:

 Helluomorpha araujoi Reichardt, 1974
 Helluomorpha eulinae Reichardt, 1974
 Helluomorpha heros (Gory, 1833)
 Helluomorpha macroptera Chaudoir, 1850

References

Anthiinae (beetle)